Serhiy Kravchenko (born 23 March 1990 in Kherson Oblast, Ukrainian SSR) is a professional Ukrainian football striker who plays for Tavriya Simferopol.

Career
Kravchenko is the product of the UOR Donetsk and Metalurh Zaporizhzhia School Systems. He spent all his career as a player in different clubs of the Ukrainian First League and the Ukrainian Second League. He began in FC Hirnyk-Sport Komsomolsk in the Ukrainian Second League, and was signed by Ukrainian Premier League club Vorskla Poltava, but did not play in any game for this side. In July 2011 he signed a contract with FC Tytan Armyansk.

References

External links

1990 births
Living people
Ukrainian footballers
Ukraine student international footballers
FC Hirnyk-Sport Horishni Plavni players
FC Vorskla Poltava players
FC Tytan Armyansk players
FC Helios Kharkiv players
MFC Mykolaiv players
SC Tavriya Simferopol players
Ukrainian First League players
Ukrainian Second League players
Association football forwards
Sportspeople from Kherson Oblast